Irene Williams Coit (September 24, 1872 – August 2, 1945) won a reputation by being the first woman passing the Yale College entrance examination in 1891, an event that was instrumental to the cause of co-education in American colleges.

Early life
Irene Williams Coit was born in Norwich, Connecticut, on September 24, 1872. She was the only daughter of General James Bolles Coit (1836-1894). Coit came of old New England stock. Her father, General James B. Coit, was a distinguished soldier in the Civil War. In the administration of President Cleveland he was chief of a pension bureau in Washington. Her mother, Anne "Annie" Willoughby (1849-1914), was the daughter of A. P. Willoughby, representing one of the oldest families in Norwich.

She took the full classical course in the Norwich free academy and was graduated in June 1891, with highest honors. Her determination to try the Yale examinations with the male classical students of her class, was born solely of her generous ambition. Her instructor, Dr. Robert P. Keep, arranged to have Prof. Seymour, of Yale, give Coil an examination with his class. She was accepted on July 8, 1891 and The New York Times wrote: "She is the only young woman who has taken the examinations at Yale University and been notified by the Faculty that, except for reasons of sex, she is in every way fitted for the institution." A year after she took the exam, two more women passed it.

Career

Besides her aptitude as a student, Coit manifested a marked literary capacity. Her first essay in the field of letters was especially successful. Since the summer of 1891 she contributed to various newspapers and publications a variety of articles.

In 1893 she moved to Geneva to teach in the DeLancey Private School where she was employed for two years until her marriage. For half century, since her marriage in 1895 to the postmaster of Geneva, she was a leader in Geneva civic affairs.

Personal life
On September 10, 1895, she married Henry Bronson Graves (1860-1955), the postmaster of Geneva, and had 7 children: Henry Bronson Graves (1896-1980), Richard Nelson Graves (1898-1919), Ralph Coit Graves (1901-1959), Elizabeth Constance Graves (1906-1945), Eleanor Howland Graves (1907-2000), Irene Willoughby Graves (1908-1999), Barbara Ann Graves (b. 1913), who served with the American Red Cross in Paris during World War II. She lived at 139 N. Brook Street, Geneva.

She died on August 2, 1945, and is buried at Glenwood Cemetery, Geneva, New York.

References

1873 births
1945 deaths
19th-century American writers
19th-century American women writers
20th-century American writers
20th-century American women writers
People from Norwich, Connecticut
Wikipedia articles incorporating text from A Woman of the Century